Saburo Ishikura (石倉 三郎 Ishikura Saburō, born December 16, 1946 in Kagawa, Japan) is a Japanese actor that has acted in several movies directed by Beat Takeshi.  He has also appeared in a few of Takeshi's recent films which include Zatoichi (2003) as Boss Ogi and Asakusa Kid (2002).

He has also made guest appearances in Gaki No Tsukai Batsu Games. Specifically 2008's Newspaper Agency as a man in a oversize bag and 2009's Hotel in a golf bag.

Filmography

Film
 Go! Go! Sakura Club (2023), Kikuo Hanada

Television 
Aoi (2000), Aoyama Tadatoshi

References

External links 
 

1946 births
Actors from Kagawa Prefecture
Living people
Japanese male actors
People from Kagawa Prefecture
People from Takamatsu, Kagawa